These are the Billboard magazine Hot Dance Club Play number one hits of 1981.

See also
1981 in music
List of number-one dance hits (United States)
List of artists who reached number one on the U.S. Dance chart

References

Some weeks may also be found at Billboard magazine courtesy of Google Books: 1980—1984.

1981
1981 record charts
1981 in American music